Xinghua is a town of Luoning County in western Henan province, China, located  southwest of the county seat. , it has 12 villages under its administration.

See also
List of township-level divisions of Henan

References

Township-level divisions of Henan
Luoning County